Kuch Kar Dikha (English: do something) is a 2014   travel reality show presented by Nokia Pakistan, based on a 38-day journey of 9 people  across Pakistan. The show  was announced on 18 February along with the launch of Lumia 1520 and 1320. First aired 28 February 2014 on ARY Digital with weekly episodes airing on Fridays.

The contestants were divided into three teams and visited Khewra Mine ,  Khanpur Dam , Nathia Gali, Balakot ,  and Muzaffarabad.

The theme song "Kuch Kar Dikha" is sung by Shankar Mahadevan, lyrics and production by Farrukh Malhar and music by Farrukh Abid and Shoaib Farrukh.

References

External links 
 Kuch Kar Dikha on Facebook

Nokia
Pakistani reality television series
ARY Digital